Nias Selatan (South Nias) Regency is a regency in North Sumatra province, Indonesia. The regency covers a land area of 2,487.98 square kilometres and according to the 2010 census had a population of 289,708; the 2020 Census showed a population of 360,531, while the official estimate for mid 2021 was 366,163. Its administrative centre is the port of Teluk Dalam. Apart from the southern portion of Nias Island, the regency also includes the smaller Batu Islands (Pulau Pulau Batu) to the south, lying between Nias and Siberut.

Administrative districts
The regency was divided into eighteen districts (kecamatan) at the time of the 2010 Census,  However, since 2010 seventeen additional districts have been created from parts of existing districts, notably in the Batu Islands where there are now seven districts compared with the three in 2010, but also on Nias Island itself where there are now twenty-eight districts within the Regency compared with fifteen in 2010. These are all tabulated below with their areas (in km2) and their populations at the 2010 Census, and the 2020 Census. They are grouped geographically (these groupings have no administrative significance). The table also includes the locations of the district administrative centres, the number of administrative villages ( a total of 459 classed as rural desa and 2 classed as urban kelurahan) in each district, and its postal code.

Notes: (a) Hibala District now comprises 42 islands. (b) The 2010 population of Tanah Masa District (comprising that part of Tanahmasa Island previously part of Hibala District) is included in the 2010 population of Hibala District. (c) Pulau Pulau Batu District now comprises 35 islands. (d) The 2010 populations of Simuk District (Simuk Island), Pulau Pulau Batu Barat District and Pulau Pulau Batu Utara District are included in the 2010 population of Pulau Pulau Batu District.
(e) The 2010 populations of the thirteen new districts on Nias Island are included in the 2010 populations of the districts from which they were split off.

There are 2 urban villages (kelurahan) - Pasar Teluk Dalam in Teluk Dalam District, and Pasar Pulau Tello in Pulau Pulau Batu District.

The four new districts in the Batu Islands are Pulau Pulau Batu Barat (West Batu Islands), Pulau Pulau Batu Utara (North Batu Islands), Simuk (Simuk Island) and Tanah Masa (that part of Tanahmasa Island previously part of Hibala District). The thirteen new districts on Nias Island itself are Hilisalawa'ahe, O'o'u, Onohazumba, Ulususua, Ulunoyo, Huruna, Luahagundre Maniomolo, Onolalu, Boronadu, Sidua'ori, Somambawa, Ulu Idanotae, and Idanotae.

Tourism

South Nias Regency is a paradise for surfers with four surfing beaches:
 Sorake Beach (Lagundri Bay) is the second best in the world after Hawaii Beach for surfing. It has five levels of waves which only occurs here. Located in Luahagundre Maniamolo district with a wave height of a maximum 3-4 metres and it depends on the wind.
 Beaches in Pulau Pulau Batu, Pulau Pulau Batu Barat, and Pulau Pulau Batu Utara districts with wave height maximum 8-9 metres, but have only limited infrastructures.

References 

Regencies of North Sumatra